Alberto Víctor Cardaccio Traversa (26 August 1949 – 28 January 2015) was a Uruguayan football midfielder, who played for the Uruguay national team between 1972 and 1974, gaining 19 caps. He was part of the Uruguay squad for the 1974 World Cup, where he made one substitute appearance in the 1-1 draw against Bulgaria, which was his last international game.

At club level, Cardaccio played in Uruguay, Argentina and Mexico for Danubio, Racing, Unión de Curtidores, Atlas, Puebla and Monterrey.

References

External links

 
 

1949 births
2015 deaths
Uruguayan footballers
Uruguayan expatriate footballers
Association football midfielders
Uruguay international footballers
1974 FIFA World Cup players
Danubio F.C. players
Racing Club de Avellaneda footballers
Unión de Curtidores footballers
Atlas F.C. footballers
Club Puebla players
C.F. Monterrey players
Uruguayan Primera División players
Argentine Primera División players
Liga MX players
Expatriate footballers in Argentina
Expatriate footballers in Mexico